Payam may refer to:

 Payam (administrative division), a political subdivision of counties in South Sudan, East Africa
 Payam, Kerala, a village and panchayat in Kerala state, India 
 Payam, Iran, a village in East Azerbaijan province, Iran 
 Payam Air, a cargo airline based in Tehran, Iran
 Payame Noor University, a series of Iranian universities
 Payam International Airport, an international airport located in Karaj, Iran
 Payam Khorasan F.C., also known as Payam Mashhad, an Iranian football (soccer) club
 IRIB Radio Payam, a radio station in Iran

People with the given name Payam 
 Payam Akhavan, Iranian-born international lawyer, working criminal tribunals
 Payam Bouyeri, Iranian wrestler
 Payam Dehkordi, Iranian actor
 Payam Feili, Iranian poet, activist and writer
 Payam Ghobadi, Iranian-born Azerbaijani taekwondo practitioner
 Payam Malekian, Iranian footballer
 Payam Niazmand, Iranian footballer
 Payam Sadeghian, Iranian footballer
 Payam Salehi, Iranian singer and guitarist

See also